Bill Kennemer (born 1946) is an American clinical psychologist and Republican politician who represented the 20th district in the Oregon State Senate from 2021 to 2023. Kennemer previously represented Oregon's 39th House district in the Oregon House of Representatives from 2009 to 2019, and Oregon's 12th Senate district from 1987 to 1997.

Early life and education 
Kennemer was born in Sacramento, California. He received a Bachelor of Arts degree from Warner Pacific College in 1968 and a PhD from Fuller Graduate School of Psychology in 1975.

Career 
Kennemer was a clinical psychologist in private practice for nearly 25 years as well as a professor of psychology. He has also worked as a truck driver and farm hand.

Political career
Kennemer cites his commitment to public service as stemming from an incident in 1952 when, after his family home was destroyed by a fire, the community came together to rebuild it. He was an Oregon State Senator from 1987 to 1996, where he served as Assistant Senate Minority Leader,
and Chair of the Senate Business, Housing and Finance Committee. He was in the BiPartisan Tourism Caucus, and the Fish and Wildlife Caucus, and was a member of the Association of Oregon Counties Legislative Committee.
He was also a member of the Education Commission of the States and the Clackamas County Economic Development Commission.

Upon leaving the Senate, he served as a Clackamas County Commissioner from 1997 to 2008, five times as chair.

In 2008, he narrowly won the closest legislative race in Oregon against first-time candidate Democrat Toby Forsberg for the Oregon House of Representatives seat held by former Minority Leader Wayne Scott. He won four more two-year terms before opting not to seek re-election in 2018.

In 2021, Kennemer was appointed to complete the Senate term of Alan Olsen, who resigned with two years remaining in his term.

Awards
As Clackamas County Commissioner in, he received the Association of Oregon Counties Board of Directors' Outstanding Service Award for 1998. Later, while a state representative, his support and advocacy in animal-related measures saw him labeled as a 2011 "Top Dog" by the Oregon Humane Society.

Memberships and committees 
 Oregon Trail Foundation, Founding Member
 Providence Milwaukie Hospital Foundation Board
 North Clackamas Chamber Board of Directors
 Warner Pacific College Board of Trustees

Personal life
Having lost his previous wife to cancer, Kennemer is now married to Cherie McGinnis. They share four children and nine grandchildren.

Electoral history

2022

References

External links
 Clackamas County Board of Commissioners
 Project VoteSmart biography

1946 births
21st-century American politicians
County commissioners in Oregon
Living people
Republican Party members of the Oregon House of Representatives
Republican Party Oregon state senators
Politicians from Oregon City, Oregon
Politicians from Sacramento, California
Warner Pacific University alumni